The Circle Game is a poetry collection written by Canadian author Margaret Atwood in 1964. The book is a highly acclaimed work of poetry and was the winner of the 1966 Governor General's Award.

Motifs 
As in most of Atwood's works, this collection of poetry explores many tensions or dualities such as the tensions between man and woman, perception and reality, and many more. The Circle Game focuses particularly on the tension between perception and reality; at first glance something may seem harmless or even friendly, but deeper inspection reveals a dark, sad, or disturbing truth.

External links 
 The Circle Game at the Internet Archive

1964 poetry books
Poetry by Margaret Atwood
Canadian poetry collections